Koyoko Yoneda, also spelt Kyoko, is a Japanese athlete. She won a gold medal in High jump and 80 meters hurdles in the 1951 Asian Games.

References

Athletes (track and field) at the 1951 Asian Games
Japanese female hurdlers
Asian Games gold medalists for Japan
Asian Games medalists in athletics (track and field)
Medalists at the 1951 Asian Games
Possibly living people
Year of birth missing
20th-century Japanese women